Thulasizwe Siphiwe Dambuza (born 19 July 1998), known professionally as Lasizwe, is a South African social media personality, actor, television presenter and YouTuber. He became a celebrity by uploading videos of himself interpreting how Africans act and behave in a comedic way. He became the first African to have a reality television show on MTV Africa. @Lasizwe: Fake It Till You Make It went up to three seasons in less than two years.

Early life and education
Lasizwe was born in Soweto, South Africa. He attended Meredale Primary, a mixed-race primary school in Meredale, south of Johannesburg, and then attended Mondeor High School in Mondeor. His mother, Lindiwe Dambuza (died in 2016) was a 40-year-old nurse at Lesedi Private Hospital, in a relationship with his father, Menzi Mcunu.

Along with his mother, his sister, Zonke Nkabinde, played a major role in his  life, guiding and protecting him. Lasizwe noticed there was something different about him: that he was uncomfortable around boys but could relate to any feminine topic. At the age of 15 he recognized that he was gay.

Career
Before starting his career, Lasizwe's mother took him for television auditions on a weekly basis across Gauteng from primary school. At the age of 12, she sat him down and explained that the weekly auditions were no longer financially viable for their family. He entered various competitions that gave away phones or audio-visual equipment. It was when he won a phone from a radio competition, which he used to start creating his first batch of content. Using his mother's laptop to record and learn basic video editing, he stored the videos on DVD discs and watched himself on the TV screen. The urge to be on TV led him to post videos on Facebook, and ultimately create relatable South African content. His first breakout video, Ek Sal Doom Jou, which was a skit based on news reports of a controversial pastor that sprayed the faces of his congregants with insect repellent in church. The video went viral which led to different brands approaching him for commercials.

Between 2020 and 2021, he managed to raise R2 million to impact students that were in need of registration fees. This was in light of the protests that took place in South Africa, where students were protesting for 'Fees must fall' and impacted the lives of 313 students, through the "R10 goes a long way" campaign.

In June 2022, he was featured on the Forbes Africa ‘30 Under 30’. Dambuza dedicated this achievement to his late parents. He wrote on Twitter:

From making videos using a phone in the streets of Pimville Soweto to making it onto #Forbes30Under30. Anything is possible. I dedicate this award to all my parents. I wish I had the opportunity to see their reactions this… Your boy is on FORBES.

Broadcast media
Lasizwe has made appearances on MTV Base Africa's You Got Got as one of the main presenters, and has presented on SABC 3's The Scoop Africa and SABC 1's The Real Goboza. He hosted an outdoor event with Mabala Noise and presented an award at the 2017 South African Hip Hop Awards. He was featured in a Nando's TV commercial and on Fanta's TV commercial as their new teen marketing director. In late 2017 he became a radio presenter on TouchHD. In 2018 he landed a role in hosting e.tv's youth show Craz-e World Live as well as VOOV TV's new show VOOVScoop.

In May 2019, he secured himself a deal to partner with GAME Stores. The deal followed after he had posted a video on his social media platforms that depicted his famed character "Nomatriquency" undergoing an interview for a position at GAME.

In July 2020, he starred on the Netflix movie, Seriously Single. In November 2020, he was the host of the SABC 1 and Telkom music show, Telkom Monate Vibes.

In September 2021, he partnered with Steers in the #NomatriquencyxSteers campaign that saw his famed character Nomatriquency getting a job at the brand. Later that year, he was the host of a Comedy Central Roast spin-off show.

On 1 April 2022, he starred on the e.tv television series Durban Gen. He is also set to make a cameo appearance on the African Netflix serie, Savage Beauty.

In August 2022, Lasizwe won two Prism Awards for his online persona Nomatriquency. On 3 September 2022, he hosted the South African Film and Television Awards.

Music
In December 2017, he was featured in Babes Wodumo and Ntando Duma's music video for the song "Jiva Phez'kombhede".

YouTube
Lasizwe is a YouTuber with more than 80 million views on his videos. In April 2019, Lasizwe received the silver play button from YouTube for reaching 100,000 subscribers.

Endorsements
In early 2018 Lasizwe became Teen Marketing Director for Fanta.

He was nominated for a Feather Award for Social media Personality of the Year, and presented with a People's Choice Award in 2021. He has also been named one of the top YouTubers in South African under the age of 24. In 2021, he was nominated as The E! African Social Star. He is also the first South African to secure an endorsement deal for a fictional character that he named "Nomatriquency".

Filmography

Awards and recognition

References

External links

 

1998 births
Living people
People from Soweto
South African television personalities
South African radio presenters
South African YouTubers
Video bloggers
South African male television actors
South African gay actors
LGBT YouTubers
20th-century South African LGBT people
21st-century South African LGBT people